Killing machine may refer to:

Film
 The Killing Machine, English language title for Shorinji Kempo a 1975 Japanese action film with Sonny Chiba, Hiroyuki Sanada and Etsuko Shiomi
 The Killing Machine, a 1994 American action film with Jeff Wincott  
 Icarus (2010 film), also known as The Killing Machine, an action film by Dolph Lundgren

Music
 Killing Machine (US title: Hell Bent for Leather), an album by Judas Priest, or the title song
 Killing Machine, a 2008 EP by Kill Switch...Klick
 "Killing Machine", a song by Alec Empire from Intelligence and Sacrifice
 "Killing Machine", a song by Destruction from Inventor of Evil

Other uses
 The Killing Machine, a 1964 science fiction novel by Jack Vance

See also

 
 Killing (disambiguation)
 Machine (disambiguation)